Michael Owen Bruce (born March 16, 1948) is an American musician. He is the co-founder, rhythm guitarist, keyboardist and backing vocalist for the rock band Alice Cooper.

Early life
Michael Owen Bruce was born to Alvin and Ruth (Owen) Bruce. The Bruce and Owen families had moved to Arizona from Kansas. The family ancestry includes Cherokee, Scottish, Irish, English and Norman French. Ruth's father, Clarence Glenn Owen, was a veteran of World War I and also a professional baseball player: "Blacky" Owen. "Al" was in the military during the 1940s and Ruth played piano on the radio and performed for many U.S.O. functions. After the military, "Al" worked for The Coca-Cola Company. Michael and his brothers, David and Paul, attended North High School in Phoenix, Arizona.

Bruce began his professional music career in the mid-1960s. Like so many young people of that time, he found inspiration in the Beatles and the Rolling Stones. After playing with The Trolls, Michael became part of Mick Mashbir's band The Wildflowers and started taking lessons. Mashbir went to Camelback High School, as did future Alice Cooper drummer Neal Smith, and had a desert property where the band rehearsed and partied. This group recorded four songs: "A Man Like Myself", "On a Day Like Today", "More Than Me" and "Moving Along with the Sun". According to Bruce, Bear Family Records (a Germany-based independent record label that specializes in reissues) eventually acquired the masters of those songs.

Bruce was also a member of another short-lived group: Our Gang (which also featured Bill Spooner, a student at North High School and later a member of The Tubes). They made no known recordings.

In 1966, Michael replaced John Tatum in a Phoenix band called The Spiders, featuring Glen Buxton, Dennis Dunaway, John Speer (replaced by Neal Smith), and Vince Furnier, all from area high schools.  One of their top venues was the VIP Club in Phoenix. In 1967 they changed the band's name to The Nazz, but had to change it again in 1968 after a legal issue over Todd Rundgren's band, Nazz. The group's new name was Alice Cooper. They premiered the name at a performance in Santa Barbara, California, on March 16, 1968, Michael's 20th birthday.

Alice Cooper
Bruce was a founding member, rhythm guitarist, keyboard player and vocalist in the original Alice Cooper group (Michael Bruce/Glen Buxton/Dennis Dunaway/Vince Furnier aka Alice Cooper/Neal Smith).

He co-wrote many of the group's hit songs, with some or all of the other members of the group. Michael often composed music and lyrics for songs; the lyrics might then be reworked by Furnier. Two examples of this process are "Halo of Flies" and "No More Mr. Nice Guy". There are several Bruce-only credited songs including "Caught in a Dream" and "Long Way To Go" from Love It to Death, and "Be My Lover" from Killer. Bruce also sang lead vocals on "Beautiful Flyaway" from the group's second album Easy Action. Their debut album Pretties For You, released in 1969, was produced by Frank Zappa and Ian Underwood; their second album Easy Action, released in 1970, was produced by David Briggs, who had worked often with Neil Young. It turned out Briggs was not a fan of the Alice Cooper band's music, and Warner Brothers chose that the album released was actually the rehearsal tapes of the group, preparing for the studio recording with Briggs. 

Following next in 1971 was the band's breakthrough album Love It to Death, released on the Warner Bros. label. Love It to Death was the first of four Alice Cooper albums produced by Bob Ezrin. The Alice Cooper group released five more albums after Love It to Death, from 1971 to 1974 (four new original albums: Killer, School's Out, Billion Dollar Babies, Muscle of Love; and the compilation album Alice Cooper's Greatest Hits containing previously released songs, with no new recordings), before taking what was intended to be a one-year time off for the group to rest and relax from their years of non-stop touring, songwriting, and recording together. Three of the group members - Michael, Neal, and Vince/Alice - wanted to record their own solo albums, reflecting their individual musical tastes. Alice's Welcome to My Nightmare was the most successful of these three solo ventures.

A full-length feature film of the original group was also released to the American cinema in 1974: Good to See You Again, Alice Cooper. The concert footage was shot on the Billion Dollar Babies Tour in 1973 and included a fictional story about an angry director seeking revenge against the band, shot at Universal Studios in Los Angeles (a scene in the "Welcome to My Nightmare" concert film, where Alice smashes the neon headstone with a shovel, was also shot during this time). The live concert portion of the movie was filmed mostly in Texas (a good deal of which was shot at the Sam Houston Coliseum in Houston, Texas), between the Dallas-Fort Worth area and Houston. Also appearing in Good to See You Again, Alice Cooper were Bob Dolin, Mick Mashbir, and magician The Amazing Randi. Dolin performed on keyboards, Mashbir on guitar, and Randi as the dentist and Alice's executioner.

In My Own Way
Around 1973–1974, Bruce began working on his own recordings with a group of musicians that included: Mick Mashbir (guitars and vocals), Bob Dolin (keyboards and vocals), Frank Crandall (bass and vocals), and Don Lindley (percussion and vocals). Mashbir and Dolin had performed as members of the touring band with the Alice Cooper "Billion Dollar Babies" tour. This line-up recorded and produced four songs ("King of America", "As Rock Rolls On", "Oh, My Love" and "Nothing on Earth") that producer Jack Douglas mixed.

When Bruce decided to leave Connecticut in 1974 and move to Lake Tahoe, Crandall and Lindley did not follow. Bruce, Dolin and Mashbir were then faced with finding a new rhythm section. Drummers, such as William "Curly" Smith (of Jo Jo Gunne) and John Barbata (of The Turtles and Crosby, Stills, Nash & Young), came to play and record at Bruce's Nevada home. However, they never could find a steady bass player.

Bruce's album In My Own Way was recorded over the course of three months in 1975 with producers Gene Cornish and Dino Danelli of The Rascals. Many different musicians came to the Record Plant and participated in the sessions for the album: Gerry Beckley (America), Jackie Lomax (The Undertakers, The Lomax Alliance, and Badger), Ricky Fataar (The Flames, The Beach Boys, and The Rutles), Keith Moon (The Who), Brian Garofalo (session bassist), David Foster (Skylark and Airplay), Hunt Sales (Todd Rundgren, Paris, Iggy Pop, Tender Fury, and Tin Machine), Tony Sales (Todd Rundgren, Iggy Pop, and Tin Machine), Mylon LeFevre, Lynn Carey and many more. American fashion photographer Francesco Scavullo did a shoot for Bruce that yielded the cover of In My Own Way.

Billion Dollar Babies
Billion Dollar Babies was the name of the band founded in 1976 by Michael Bruce, Mike Marconi, Dennis Dunaway, Bob Dolin and Neal Smith after they split from Alice Cooper in 1974. Bruce's solo album, In My Own Way, had been sold to Polydor in Germany. Polydor did a very limited test pressing and decided to shelve it without release. Originally, Billion Dollar Babies started out in the hope that Alice would return and Battle Axe would be the new record from the Alice Cooper group. That wasn't the outcome, and everyone decided to proceed without Alice. Time Magazine featured the group in a brief but hopeful write-up in 1977. There had been a fantastic and very theatrical stage show planned in which Bruce and Marconi would battle each other in the fashion of gladiators. In spite of the positive start, the band was embroiled in a legal suit over the use of the name. The stage show was far too costly and the tour was quite brief. Their only release was 1977's Battle Axe. Unfortunately, the Battle Axe record lost any momentum it had when it was recalled for mastering problems which caused the turntable needle to skip. Bruce, Dunaway and Smith had also invested a large sum of their own money in the project. Jack Douglas, who had worked on Muscle of Love with Jack Richardson, was hired to fix the mastering problem. With so many problems weighing them down, the group disbanded.

The Josiah-Bruce Band
In January 1990, Michael met a man named Josiah who worked with troubled youth. They shared a common interest in music and became friends. Josiah and Bruce soon decided to form a band and call it The Josiah Bruce Band. The band also included Ronnie Bolsega (from Hammond, Indiana) on drums, Ron Parker (from Denver Colorado) on bass, and Mike Carpenter (AKA Psych) (from Down Boy and RAFR) on guitar. They performed live and recorded an album's worth of material but nothing was ever released. Eventuality, Michael left the band and Josiah re-formed the group with Phoenix-based guitarist Rob Super as "The Josiah Band".

The Michael Bruce Group and later years
No More Mr Nice Guy : The Inside Story of the "Alice Cooper" Group by Michael Bruce and Billy James was released on October 1, 1996 (and updated and re-released in 2000). A relatively short book (159 pages), with some rare pictures from Bruce's personal collection, was published by SAF Publishing (a company in the United Kingdom). In 1996, Bruce had moved to Texas and saw his album, In My Own Way, released for the first time on compact disc by One Way Records. In 1998, while residing in Houston, Michael formed a band that performed locally and toured as The Michael Bruce Group. The members of the band were Michael Bruce (guitars, vocals and keyboards), David "Vito" Mastrovito (guitar and vocals), John Glenn (keyboards and vocals), Wilton Hudgens (bass and vocals) and Troy Powell (drums and vocals); Tom Turner (road manager and assistant). After the first leg of the 1998 tour, Mastrovito left the band; Glenn had opted out of touring from the beginning. The three piece line-up of the Michael Bruce Group (Bruce, Hudgens and Powell) performed in Clarion, Iowa at the first Glen Buxton Memorial (during their 1998 midwestern tour); Clarion is where Michael's former bandmate passed on and was laid to rest.

The band briefly relocated to the suburbs of Chicago, Illinois at the end of the summer of 1998. Bruce and Hudgens performed with Neal Smith (original Alice Cooper group drummer) at the first Chiller Theatre Convention in Washington, D.C. before returning to Texas at the end of the year. They reformed the band with Joe Garbo (drums and percussion) and Jeff Harris (sax, piano and vocals), in 2000. This version performed at Anne Rice's Coven Ball at the State Palace Theatre (New Orleans) in Louisiana and The 3rd Glen Buxton Memorial at the Whisky a Go Go in Los Angeles. Ingo Geirdal also guested on guitar with the group at the 3rd Glen Buxton Memorial.

After 2003, Bruce returned to his home state of Arizona and formed a new band. His reformed Michael Bruce Group featured Bruce (guitars and vocals), Bob Russell (guitars and vocals), Tommy Dominick (bass and keyboards) and Bob Allen (drums).

May 1, 2004 saw the debut of a new Michael Bruce Group in Tucson, Arizona. The line up was Bob Russell (guitar), Jeff Harris (sax, piano & vocals), Tommy Dominick (organ & keys), Mondo Thomas (bass), Robin Horn (son of jazz icon Paul Horn) (drums), and Bruce (guitars, keys, & vocals).

September 16, 2005 saw the release of a new Michael Bruce album authorized for Iceland in a limited edition of 200 copies in a deluxe digipak. The Second Coming of Michael Bruce – Alive & Re-Cooperated was Bruce's first official release in many years (although exclusive only to Iceland at this time) and featured 17 songs recorded in Iceland 2002–2003. The 74 minute long CD included new studio recordings as well as previously unheard live performances by Michael Bruce and his Icelandic band performing songs from throughout his career. All the recordings were professionally done on 24-track and mixed by Ingo & Silli Geirdal. The deluxe digipak featured artwork of Michael Bruce by Ingo, band photos and exclusive liner notes by Dennis Dunaway.

During 2010, Bruce was called on for participation in a new Alice Cooper record Welcome 2 My Nightmare (the sequel to the original Welcome to My Nightmare). Bruce co-wrote the song "When Hell Comes Home" on the album. Welcome 2 My Nightmare also featured performances by Neal Smith, Dennis Dunaway, Dick Wagner and Steve Hunter. Alice also invited Bruce, Hunter, Dunaway and Smith to perform with him that December at his annual Christmas Pudding fundraiser at The Dodge Theatre in Phoenix, Arizona.

In spring of 2011, Bruce (as a member of the original Alice Cooper group) was inducted into the Rock and Roll Hall of Fame in the "Performer" category.

In early 2016, Bruce's new band, Michael Bruce Force, played a show at Asylum Records celebrating Record Store Day on April 6, 2016, in Mesa, Arizona.

Bruce was featured on three songs on Alice Cooper's next release, the 2017 album Paranormal: the song "Rats", as well as two bonus tracks featuring original Alice Cooper band members: "Genuine American Girl" and "You and All of Your Friends". He subsequently featured on several tracks on Cooper's 2021 album Detroit Stories.

Discography

Solo 
  In My Own Way, Polydor (1975) (Re-issued on CD by One Way Records in 1997)
  Rock Rolls On, ETR (Euro-Tech Records & Tapes) (1983) (Re-issued on CD by Gonzo Multimedia in 2018)
  In My Own Way - The Complete Sessions (2-CD Set), Burning Airlines (2002)
  Halo of Ice (Live in Reykjavik, Iceland, May 2001), Burning Airlines (2002)
  The Second Coming of Michael Bruce - Alive and Re-Cooperated (Live in Akureyri and Reykjavik, Iceland, October 2002; plus bonus studio tracks), GB Records (2005)
  Be Your Lover - Michael Bruce Anthology, Evangeline Records (2011)

With Billion Dollar Babies 
 Battle Axe (1977)
 Complete Battle Axe (3-CD set) (2002)

With Alice Cooper Group 
 Pretties For You (1969)
 Easy Action (1970)
 Love It to Death (1971)
 Killer (1971)
 School's Out (1972)
 Billion Dollar Babies (1973)
 Muscle of Love (1973)
 Alice Cooper's Greatest Hits (1974)
 1969 Live at the Whisky a Go-Go (1992)
 Welcome 2 My Nightmare (2011)
 Paranormal (2017)
 Live From The Astroturf (2018)
 Detroit Stories (2021)

With Ant-Bee 
 Lunar Muzik (1997)
 Electronic Church Muzik (2011)

References

Bibliography

1948 births
Living people
Musicians from Phoenix, Arizona
Rhythm guitarists
American folk guitarists
American male guitarists
American heavy metal guitarists
American rock singers
American heavy metal keyboardists
American rock keyboardists
American rock guitarists
Alice Cooper (band) members
Guitarists from Arizona
20th-century American guitarists
21st-century American guitarists
21st-century American keyboardists
North High School (Phoenix, Arizona) alumni
20th-century American keyboardists